Perth Concert Hall is a space that houses a programme of concerts, performances and contemporary art in Perth, Scotland.  It is a successor to Perth City Hall and like sister venue Perth Theatre is leased to Horsecross Arts Limited by Perth & Kinross Council. The building was opened by Her Majesty Elizabeth II in 2005.

Architecture 
The contract was the result of the Perth 2000 international architectural competition, the jury of which was chaired by Eva Jiricna, and won by BDP Glasgow in 1998.
The project started on site in 2003 and completed in Summer 2005 at a construction cost of £12.5m.

Auditorium 
At the heart of the Perth Concert Hall building BDP has designed a fully flexible 1,200 seat concert hall, the Gannochy Auditorium, which features uniquely configured floor lifts and movable seating wagons to provide both raked seating and a large-scale flat floor. The format of the concert hall can also accommodate events such as conference, sports, fashion shows, dinner dances and even a motor show.
BDP Acoustics modeled the main auditorium's natural acoustic for orchestral music, with flexibility for a range of acoustic environments provided by retractable acoustic banners and powerful electro-acoustic systems. Commissioning reports confirm that the auditorium is an excellent venue for music events or speech.

It won the Scottish Design Awards for Best Building for Public Use 2007.

Performance spaces and facilities 
The Main Auditorium is a truly flexible facility - offering a wide range of layouts for conferences and events as its unique design means that part of the seating can disappear to create a flat floor ideal for cabaret style conferences, banquets, exhibitions and dinner dances. Standard performances can seat 1200 and standing performances up to 1600.

Other spaces in the hall include the Norie-Miller Suite which can accommodate 120 people, or be split into two rooms at 50 and 60. There are also a number of meeting rooms and break-out spaces.

Notable events 
A primary feature of its yearly program includes the 'Perth Concert Series of Scottish Orchestras'.
As well as classical music, the hall plays host to opera and ballet, musical theatre, talks, rock and pop, folk, world and country, swing and comedy.

It is also the main venue for the Southern Fried Festival.

It has held numerous political party conferences, including the Scottish National Party, Scottish Conservatives and Scottish Labour

References

External links 
 

Buildings and structures in Perth, Scotland
Concert halls in Scotland
Buildings and structures completed in 2005